Lucky Dog may refer to:

The Lucky Dog (1921), the first film to include both Stan Laurel and Oliver Hardy
Lucky Dog (film), 1933 film about a man searching for his dog
Lucky Dog (play), a 2004 play by Leo Butler about marital solitude
Lucky dog, a rule in motorsport also known as the beneficiary rule 
Lucky Dog, a TV program, part of CBS Dream Team

Dogs named "Lucky"
Lucky, a dog in the Disney film One Hundred and One Dalmatians and subsequent adaptations
Lucky (war dog), received the Dickin Medal for bravery in the Malayan Emergency 
Lucky (dog), one of two dogs owned by US presidents